Ṣafiyy al-Dawla Muḥammad ibn ʿAli ibn Jaʾfar ibn Falāh was the Fatimid governor of Aleppo between October 1022 and April 1023. He was specifically assigned to govern the city, while the citadel of Aleppo was assigned to a separate governor, the eunuch Yumn al-Dawla Sa'adat. This marked the first time the Fatimids appointed separate rulers for the city and citadel of Aleppo since they gained direct control over the city in October 1016. Safiyy al-Dawla belonged to the Kutama, a militant Berber group that played a major role in the Fatimid military. He was the son of Ali ibn Ja'far and grandson of Ja'far ibn Fallah, both of whom were Fatimid generals. He was bestowed with the title ṣafiyy al-dawla (chosen of the State). Safiyy al-Dawla and Yumn al-Dawla were appointed to Aleppo to replace Abu'l-Najm Badr. Nothing is known about their reign and Safiyy al-Dawla was dismissed in April 1023, and succeeded by Sanad al-Dawla Hasan.

References

Bibliography

11th-century people from the Fatimid Caliphate
Fatimid governors of Aleppo
Kutama
11th-century Berber people